The W. H. Murphy House near Shoshone, Idaho, United States, was built in 1928 by stonemason Jack Oughton and by Sandy Reed.  It was listed on the National Register of Historic Places in 1983.

References

Houses on the National Register of Historic Places in Idaho
Houses completed in 1928
Houses in Lincoln County, Idaho
National Register of Historic Places in Lincoln County, Idaho